The Diego Rivera Gallery is building, formerly a student-directed art gallery and exhibition space for work by San Francisco Art Institute students.

History 
The gallery provided an opportunity for BFA, MFA and Post-Baccalaureate students to present their work in a gallery setting, to use the space for large-scale installations, or to experiment with artistic concepts and concerns in a public venue. Exhibitions changed weekly and were open on Tuesdays. About 40 shows per year were scheduled, and close to 200 students were exhibit each year.

In ex-faculty member Charles Boone's time at SFAI, he attended nearly every opening reception.

Mural 
The Making of a Fresco Showing the Building of a City (1931) is one of four fresco murals in the San Francisco Bay Area painted by Mexican artist Diego Rivera. Rivera's mural seems to be painted for and about a working class audience.

References

External links 
 Official website
 Full Story of the Mural at SFAI Website
 National Museum of Murals and Mosaics
 2009 MFA Exhibition, San Francisco Chronicle
 2006 MFA Exhibition, San Francisco Chronicle

Contemporary art galleries in the United States
Arts organizations based in the San Francisco Bay Area
Organizations based in San Francisco
Art museums and galleries in San Francisco
Russian Hill, San Francisco